Joseph Ferdinand Wingate (June 29, 1786 – unknown), son of Joshua and Hannah Carr Wingate, was a U.S. Representative from Maine.

Born in Haverhill, Massachusetts, Wingate received a limited schooling.
He engaged in the mercantile business in Bath, Maine, until 1820, part of Massachusetts, District of Maine. He married Margaret Gay Tingey, daughter of Commodore Thomas Tingey, USN, in 1808.
He served as member of the Massachusetts House of Representatives, 1818 and 1819.
He served as collector of customs at the port of Bath from 1820 to 1824.

Wingate was elected to the Twentieth and Twenty-first Congresses (March 4, 1827 – March 3, 1831). Wingate's uncle, Paine Wingate, was a U.S. Representative, U.S. Senator, and Justice of the Supreme Court, all of New Hampshire. Joseph Wingate moved eventually to Windsor, Maine. His daughter, Sydney Ellen Wingate, married George P. Sewall.

References

1786 births
Year of death unknown
Politicians from Haverhill, Massachusetts
People from Bath, Maine
Members of the Massachusetts House of Representatives
People from Kennebec County, Maine
National Republican Party members of the United States House of Representatives from Maine